Starkenberg is a municipality in the district Altenburger Land, in Thuringia, Germany. On 1 December 2008, it incorporated the former municipalities Naundorf and Tegkwitz.

History
Within the German Empire (1871–1918), Starkenberg was part of the Duchy of Saxe-Altenburg.

References

Altenburger Land
Duchy of Saxe-Altenburg